Sudjati (13 March 1954 – 8 December 2020) was an Indonesian politician.

Career
He served as Regent of Bulungan Regency, in North Kalimantan, from February 2016 until his death in office in December 2020 during the COVID-19 pandemic in Indonesia.

Death
Regent Sudjati was diagnosed with COVID-19 and self-quarantined at home before being hospitalized. He died from COVID-19 at Tanjung Selor Regional General Hospital (RSUD) in Tanjung Selor on 8 December 2020, during the COVID-19 pandemic in Indonesia at the age of 66.

References

1954 births
2020 deaths
Mayors and regents of places in North Kalimantan
Regents of places in Indonesia
People from Semarang
People from Bulungan Regency
Deaths from the COVID-19 pandemic in Indonesia